Emir Šarganović (born 23 September 1983) is a Bosnian slalom canoer who competed from the late 1990s to the mid-2000s. Competing at the 2004 Summer Olympics in Athens in the K-1 event, he finished twenty-third in the qualification round, failing to progress to the semifinals.

References
Sports-Reference.com profile

1983 births
Bosnia and Herzegovina male canoeists
Canoeists at the 2004 Summer Olympics
Living people
Olympic canoeists of Bosnia and Herzegovina